Le Puy green lentil is a small, mottled, slate-gray/green lentil of the Lens esculenta puyensis (or L. culinaris puyensis) variety. In the US, this type of lentil may be grown and sold as French green lentils or Puy lentils.

The term "Lentille verte du Puy" is protected throughout the European Union (EU) and UK as a Protected Designation of Origin (PDO), and in France as an appellation d'origine contrôlée (AOC). In the EU, the term may only be used to designate lentils that come from the prefecture of Le Puy (most notably in the commune of Le Puy-en-Velay) in the Auvergne region of France. These lentils have been grown in the region for over 2,000 years and it is said that they have gastronomic qualities that come from the terroir (in this case attributed to the area's volcanic soil). They are praised for their unique peppery flavor and the ability to retain their shape after cooking.

References

External links

La lentille verte du Puy 

Lentil
Edible legumes
French products with protected designation of origin